Jarmila Gajdošová was the defending champion, but lost to Magdaléna Rybáriková in the quarterfinals.

Chanelle Scheepers won her first WTA singles title, defeating Rybáriková 6–2, 6–2 in the final.

Seeds

  Maria Kirilenko (semifinals)
  Jarmila Gajdošová (quarterfinals)
  Ksenia Pervak (first round, retired due to left shoulder injury)
  Petra Martić (quarterfinals)
  Bojana Jovanovski (first round)
  Alberta Brianti (first round)
  Chanelle Scheepers (champion)
  Magdaléna Rybáriková (final)

Qualifying

Main draw

Finals

Top half

Bottom half

External links
 Main draw

Guangzhou International Women's Open - Singles
Guangzhou International Women's Open